Zohmingliana Ralte (born 2 October 1990) is an Indian professional footballer who last played  as a defender for Chennaiyin FC in the Indian Super League.

Career

Early career
Born in Aizawl, Mizoram, Ralte began his career at the academy of Mohun Bagan in 2005 before leaving the academy after one year due to being homesick. He then joined the Rangdajied United youth team in 2007 before joining Shillong Lajong in 2008. While with Shillong Lajong Ralte played in the I-League and I-League 2nd Division.

Pune
On 30 July 2012 it was announced that Ralte had signed with Pune F.C. of the I-League on a two-year deal. He made his league debut for Pune on 5 January 2013 against United Sikkim when he came on as a 92nd-minute substitute for James Moga. Ralte scored his first ever professional goal on 24 May 2015 as he headed in Arata Izumi's deflected corner in the sixth minute, in what proved to be the only goal in a 1-0 victory over his former club Shillong Lajong.

NorthEast United FC
In July 2015 Ralte was drafted to play for NorthEast United FC in the 2015 Indian Super League.

DSK Shivajians
Ralte signed for DSK Shivajians for one season.

Aizawl FC
In December 2016, Ralte signed for his home side Aizawl F.C. for 2016-17 I-League season. He was the captain of Aizawl and guided them to lift the maiden I-League trophy. Ralte scored a crucial goal against Mohun Bagan which was known to be the title winning goal of the season.

Bengaluru FC
On July 23rd 2017, Ralte was drafted to Bengaluru FC.

Honours

Club
Aizawl FC
I-League(1): 2016–17

References

External links 
 Pune Football Club Profile.

1989 births
Living people
People from Aizawl
Indian footballers
Shillong Lajong FC players
Pune FC players
NorthEast United FC players
Bengaluru FC players
Association football central defenders
Footballers from Mizoram
I-League players
I-League 2nd Division players